Club Deportivo Estepona Fútbol Senior is a Spanish football team based in Estepona, Málaga, in the autonomous community of Andalucia. Founded in 2014, it plays in Segunda Federación – Group 5, holding home games at Estadio Municipal Francisco Muñoz Pérez, with a capacity of 3,800 people.

History
Founded in 2014 as a replacement to dissolved Unión Estepona CF, the club initially created a youth setup named Club Deportivo Estepona Fútbol Base, later starting a senior side named Club Deportivo Estepona Fútbol Senior for the 2014–15 campaign. After two consecutive promotions in their first two campaigns, the club spent four seasons in the División de Honor before achieving promotion to Tercera División in May 2020.

Estepona suffered an immediate relegation back to División de Honor (now the sixth tier after the creation of a new third tier), but won their group in the 2021–22 season and returned to Tercera on 30 May 2022. On 20 August, the club achieved administrative promotion to Segunda Federación after buying the place of dissolved Extremadura UD.

Season to season

1 season in Segunda Federación
1 season in Tercera División

Notes

References

External links
 
Soccerway team profile

Football clubs in Andalusia
Association football clubs established in 2014
2014 establishments in Spain